Mervyn Patrick Laffey (3 July 1925 – 17 January 2007) was an Australian rules footballer who played with Footscray in the Victorian Football League (VFL).

Notes

External links 

		

1925 births		
2007 deaths		
Australian rules footballers from Melbourne
Western Bulldogs players
People from Footscray, Victoria